Artemis 81 is a British television play which was written by David Rudkin and directed by Alastair Reid. Commissioned by BBC producer David Rose, it was broadcast by the BBC on 29 December 1981. It was one of the last TV performances from Anthony Steel.

Plot summary
Occult novelist Gideon Harlax (Hywel Bennett) is drawn into an epic battle between Helith (Sting), the Angel of Light and Asrael (Roland Curram), the Angel of Death.

Selected cast
Hywel Bennett - Gideon Harlax 
Dinah Stabb - Gwen Meredith 
Dan O'Herlihy - Albrecht Von Drachenfels 
Sting - Helith 
Roland Curram - Asrael 
Anthony Steel - Tristram Guise 
 Margaret Whiting - Laura Guise 
Ian Redford - Jed Thaxter 
Mary Ellen Ray - Sonia 
Cornelius Garrett - Pastor 
Ingrid Pitt - Hitchcock Blonde 
Daniel Day-Lewis - Library Student 
Sylvia Coleridge - Library Scholar

DVD release
Artemis 81 was released on DVD in 2007. It was incorrectly issued as Artemis '81. The 81 is the number of a star, not a date.

Further reading
 David Rudkin: Sacred Disobedience: an expository study of his drama 1959-96 by David Ian Rabey, Oxford, Routledge, 1998

See also
 Manichaeism

References

External links

Artemis 81 at www.davidrudkin.com

1981 plays
BBC television dramas
British supernatural television shows
English-language television shows
Films directed by Alastair Reid